The 1981 World Series of Poker (WSOP) was a series of poker tournaments held at Binion's Horseshoe.

Preliminary events

Main Event

There were 75 entrants to the main event. Each paid $10,000 to enter the tournament. This main event was notable as the first one to have all final table players to receive a share of the prize pool. The final hand saw Green with 10 9 and Ungar with A Q, and the board was 7 8 4 4 Q. The 1981 Main Event was Stu Ungar's second consecutive World Championship.

Final table

Other High Finishes

NB: This list is restricted to top 30 finishers with an existing Wikipedia entry.

References

World Series of Poker
World Series of Poker